The 1922 New Zealand tour rugby to New South Wales was the tenth tour by the New Zealand national team to Australia.

During the First World War the activity of Rugby Union was suspended. In Australia, the sport was initially reprised only in New South Wales (many players switched to Rugby league especially in Queensland), so official test matches between the two national sides were not resumed until 1929. 

The three most important matches were played against the New South Wales Selection, and NSW won the 3 match series 2–1. In 1986 the Australian Rugby Union accorded Test status to the New South Wales matches played against international teams in the 1920–1928 period, but the matches against the All Blacks are not recorded as Tests by the New Zealand Rugby Union.

Before and after the tour, New Zealand played some matches in their own country against provincial selections.

Match summary
Complete list of matches played by the All Blacks in New South Wales:

 Test matches

Notes

References

New Zealand
New Zealand tour
Australia tour
New Zealand national rugby union team tours of Australia